The Lawton Open was a golf tournament on the LPGA Tour from 1956 to 1958. It was played in Lawton, Oklahoma, at the Lawton Municipal Golf Course in 1956 and at the Lawton Country Club  in 1957 and 1958.

Winners
1958 Beverly Hanson
1957 Marlene Hagge
1956 Betty Dodd

References

Former LPGA Tour events
Golf in Oklahoma
Lawton, Oklahoma
Women's sports in Oklahoma